Transcription elongation factor A protein 1 is a protein that in humans is encoded by the TCEA1 gene.

In other organisms, this gene is better known as transcription elongation factor II S (TFIIS). It mainly helps to resolve backtracked elongation complexes by inducing a cut in the RNAP active site, so reaction becomes possible again. It is also found in the eukaryotic transcription preinitiation complex. A homolog in archaea performs the same main task, while bacteria use the non-homologous Gre.

Interactions 

TCEA1 has been shown to interact with GTF2H1 and POLR2A.

References

Further reading